The South Australian Railways Gc Class locomotive was built by Robert Stephenson and Company and entered service on the Adelaide Glenelg & Suburban Railway in 1879. In November 1881, the locomotive was sold to the Glenelg Railway Company and became their No. 6. It entered service on the South Australian Railways on 16 December 1899 following the purchase of the Glenelg Railway Company. The SAR classed this locomotive as Gc and numbered it 160. No. 160 was then scrapped on the 26th of July 1905.

References

Gc
Broad gauge locomotives in Australia
Robert Stephenson and Company locomotives
4-4-0T locomotives
Railway locomotives introduced in 1879

Passenger locomotives 
Scrapped locomotives